Mount Pleasant is an unincorporated community in Gentry County, in the U.S. state of Missouri.

History
Mount Pleasant was platted in 1856. Mount Pleasant is a commendatory name. A variant name was "Ellington". A post office called Mount Pleasant was established in 1862, the name was changed to Ellington in 1879, and the post office closed in 1890.

References

Unincorporated communities in Gentry County, Missouri
Unincorporated communities in Missouri